Baron Jean Joseph Antoine Marie de Witte  (24 February 1808, Antwerp - 29 July 1889, Paris) was a Belgian archeologist, epigraphist and numismatist.

He collaborated with François Lenormant in founding the Gazette archéologique at the Bibliothèque nationale de France.

External links
 Biography and bibliography of Jean Joseph Antoine Marie de Witte by the Chevalier Edmond Marchal.

References 

1808 births
1889 deaths
Scientists from Antwerp
Belgian archaeologists